The 43rd Los Angeles Film Critics Association Awards, given by the Los Angeles Film Critics Association (LAFCA), honored the best in film for 2017.

Winners

Best Picture:
Call Me by Your Name
Runner-up: The Florida Project
Best Director: (TIE)
Guillermo del Toro – The Shape of Water
Luca Guadagnino – Call Me by Your Name
Best Actor:
Timothée Chalamet – Call Me by Your Name
Runner-up: James Franco – The Disaster Artist
Best Actress:
Sally Hawkins – The Shape of WaterRunner-up: Frances McDormand – Three Billboards Outside Ebbing, MissouriBest Supporting Actor:
Willem Dafoe – The Florida ProjectRunner-up: Sam Rockwell – Three Billboards Outside Ebbing, MissouriBest Supporting Actress:Laurie Metcalf – Lady BirdRunner-up: Mary J. Blige – MudboundBest Screenplay:Jordan Peele – Get OutRunner-up: Martin McDonagh – Three Billboards Outside Ebbing, MissouriBest Cinematography:Dan Laustsen – The Shape of WaterRunner-up: Roger Deakins – Blade Runner 2049Best Editing:Lee Smith – DunkirkRunner-up: Tatiana S. Riegel – I, TonyaBest Production Design:Dennis Gassner – Blade Runner 2049Runner-up: Paul Denham Austerberry – The Shape of WaterBest Music Score:Jonny Greenwood – Phantom ThreadRunner-up: Alexandre Desplat – The Shape of WaterBest Foreign Language Film: (TIE)BPM (Beats per Minute) • FranceLoveless • RussiaBest Documentary/Non-Fiction Film:Faces PlacesRunner-up: JaneBest Animation:The BreadwinnerRunner-up: CocoNew Generation Award:Greta GerwigCareer Achievement Award:Max von SydowThe Douglas Edwards Experimental/Independent Film/Video Award:' Lee Anne Schmitt – Purge This Land''

References

External links
 43rd Annual Los Angeles Film Critics Association Awards

2017
Los Angeles Film Critics Association Awards
Los Angeles Film Critics Association Awards
Los Angeles Film Critics Association Awards
Los Angeles Film Critics Association Awards